Nick Michael Ekelund-Arenander (born 23 January 1989 in Södermalm, Sweden) is a Danish/Swedish sprinter specialising in the 400 metres. He represented Denmark at the 2013 World Championships reaching the semifinals.

His personal bests in the event are 45.50 seconds outdoors (Madrid 2013) and 46.31 seconds indoors (Stockholm 2014).

Competition record

References

1989 births
Living people
Danish male sprinters
Swedish male sprinters
Athletes from Stockholm
World Athletics Championships athletes for Denmark
Swedish Athletics Championships winners
Competitors at the 2015 Summer Universiade